A Millisecond Furnace is a device used for cracking naphtha into ethylene, by extremely short (50 to 100 millisecond) exposure to temperatures of about 900 degrees Celsius, followed by a rapid quenching below 750 degrees Celsius.

It was developed by M. W. Kellogg and Idemitsu in the 1970s.

References

Oil refining